Pattern welding is the practice in sword and knife making of forming a blade of several metal pieces of differing composition that are forge-welded together and twisted and manipulated to form a pattern. Often  mistakenly called Damascus steel, blades forged in this manner often display bands of slightly different patterning along their entire length. These bands can be highlighted for cosmetic purposes by proper polishing or acid etching. Pattern welding was an outgrowth of laminated or piled steel, a similar technique used to combine steels of different carbon contents, providing a desired mix of hardness and toughness.  Although modern steelmaking processes negate the need to blend different steels, pattern welded steel is still used by custom knifemakers for the cosmetic effects it produces.

History

Pattern welding developed out of the necessarily complex process of making blades that were both hard and tough from the erratic and unsuitable output from early iron smelting in bloomeries.  The bloomery does not generate temperatures high enough to melt iron and steel, but instead reduces the iron oxide ore into particles of pure iron, which then weld into a mass of sponge iron, consisting of lumps of impurities in a matrix of relatively pure iron, which is too soft to make a good blade.  Carburizing thin iron bars or plates forms a layer of harder, high carbon steel on the surface, and early bladesmiths would forge these bars or plates together to form relatively homogeneous bars of steel.  This laminating process, in which different types of steel together produce patterns that can be seen in the surface of the finished blade, forms the basis for pattern welding.

Pattern welding in Europe
Pattern welding dates to the first millennium BC, with Celtic, and later Germanic swords exhibiting the technique, with the Romans describing the blade patternation.
By the 2nd and 3rd century AD, the Celts commonly used pattern welding for decoration in addition to structural reasons. The technique involves folding and forging alternating layers of steel into rods, then twisting the steel to form complex patterns when forged into a blade.  By the 6th and 7th centuries, pattern welding had reached a level where thin layers of patterned steel were being overlaid onto a soft iron core, making the swords far better as the iron gave them a flexible and springy core that would take any shock from sword blows to stop the blade bending or snapping.  Arguably the most famous group of pattern-welded Viking swords – and incidentally one of the first known examples of value being increased by the presence of a brand name – are the Ulfberht swords, of which 166 are known to exist.  By the end of the Viking era, pattern welding fell out of use in Europe.

In medieval swords, pattern welding was more prevalent than commonly thought.  However, the presence of rust makes detection difficult without repolishing.

During the Middle ages, Wootz steel was produced in India and exported globally, including to Europe.  The similarities in the markings led many to believe it was the same process being used, and pattern welding was revived by European smiths who were attempting to duplicate the Damascus steel.  While the methods used by Damascus smiths to produce their blades was lost over the centuries, recent efforts by metallurgists and bladesmiths (such as Verhoeven and Pendray) to reproduce steel with identical characteristics have yielded a process that does not involve pattern welding. However even these attempts have not been a huge success.

Modern decorative use
The ancient swordmakers exploited the aesthetic qualities of pattern welded steel. The Vikings, in particular, were fond of twisting  bars of steel around each other, welding the bars together by hammering and then repeating the process with the resulting bars, to create complex patterns in the final steel bar. Two bars twisted in opposite directions created the common chevron pattern. Often, the center of the blade was a core of soft steel, and the edges were solid high carbon steel, similar to the laminates of the Japanese.

The American Bladesmith Society's Master Smith test, for example, requires a 300 layer blade to be forged.  Large numbers of layers are generally produced by folding, where a small number of layers are welded together, then the blank is cut in half, stacked, and welded again, with each operation doubling the number of layers. Starting with just two layers, eight folding operations will yield 512 layers in the blank. A blade ground from such a blank will show a grain much like an object cut from a block of wood, with similar random variations in pattern.  Some manufactured objects can be re-purposed into pattern welded blanks.  "Cable Damascus", forged from high carbon multi-strand cable, is a popular item for bladesmiths to produce, producing a finely grained, twisted pattern, while chainsaw chains produce a pattern of randomly positioned blobs of color.

Some modern bladesmiths have taken pattern welding to new heights, with elaborate applications of traditional pattern welding techniques, as well as with new technology.  A layered billet of steel rods with the blade blank cut perpendicular to the layers can also produce some spectacular patterns, including mosaics or even writing. Powder metallurgy allows alloys that would not normally be compatible to be combined into solid bars.  Different treatments of the steel after it is ground and polished, such as bluing, etching, or various other chemical surface treatments that react differently to the different metals used can create bright, high-contrast finishes on the steel. Some master smiths go as far as to use techniques such as electrical discharge machining to cut interlocking patterns out of different steels, fit them together, then weld the resulting assembly into a solid block of steel.

Etymology
The term 'pattern welding' was coined by English archaeologist Herbert Maryon in a 1948 paper: "The welding of these swords represents an excessively difficult operation. I do not know of finer smith's work... I have named the technique ‘pattern welding’... Examples of pattern-welding range in date from the third century to the Viking Age."

See also
 Bulat steel, a Russian crucible steel
 Damascus steel, a steel used in swordmaking during the medieval period
 Forged in Fire a History channel competitive television show on forged knife and sword making
 Hamon (swordsmithing)
 Japanese sword construction includes a specific form of pattern welding.
 Mokume-gane, a similar technique, often for precious metals, used to produce decorative pieces
 Wootz steel, an Indian crucible steel

References

Sources

External links
 Bladesmith Kevin Cashen's page on pattern welding
 Ancient carburisation of iron to steel: a comment
 Mediæval Sword Virtual Museum, which contains close-up images of Viking swords, showing the pattern welding structures.

Welding
Steelmaking
Blade weapons